The title of Advocatus Sancti Sepulchri, or Advocate of the Holy Sepulchre, has been ascribed to Godfrey of Bouillon in his role as the first Latin ruler of Jerusalem. In the aftermath of the First Crusade, there was disagreement among the clergy and secular leaders as the leadership of the Kingdom of Jerusalem. There was opposition to the naming of a king over the Holy City and the wearing of a crown in the city where Christ suffered with a crown of thorns. The original sources differ on the actual title assumed by Godfrey. However, it is generally accepted by most modern historians that, once Godfrey was selected to be leader, he declined to be crowned king instead taking the titles of prince (princeps) and advocate or defender of the Holy Sepulchre (advocatus Sancti Sepulchri).

The First Crusade
At the beginning of eleventh century, the city of Jerusalem had been under Islamic rule for almost five centuries. Then a series of events began to limit the access of Christian pilgrims to the Holy City and encroach on the Byzantine Empire. The First Crusade, first called for in 1095, sought to restore Jerusalem to Christian control. Begun as a joint effort of Western Europe and Constantinople, the final determination was that newly captured territory would be formed as its own kingdom.

Background
Among the earliest of the faithful to travel to the Holy Land was Saint Helena, mother of Constantine the Great, whose pilgrimage began in 326 AD. According to tradition, her travels led to the discovery of the True Cross. On the site of discovery, her son Constantine ordered the building of the Church of the Holy Sepulchre. Pilgrimages to the Holy Land became a tradition of devout Christians and continued even after the conquest of these lands by the Muslims following the Siege of Jerusalem in the 7th century. 

A major disruption to these pilgrimages when the Fatimid caliph al-Hakim ordered the destruction of the Church of the Holy Sepulchre in Jerusalem on 28 September 1009. The subsequent persecution of Christians and destruction of their churches lasted for more than a decade. After the Battle of Manzikert in 1071, the Seljuk Turks overcame the Byzantines and invaded Asia Minor. Shortly thereafter, the Seljuks captured Jerusalem from the Fatimides, and his fellow tribesmen  systematically disrupted Christian pilgrimage routes. This would lead to the First Crusade.

The call to arms

The beginning of the First Crusade is generally marked by the Council of Clermont held from 17–27 November 1095 by Urban II, and resulted in the mobilization of Western Europe to go to the Holy Land. After the city of Jerusalem was captured by the Seljuks, the cradle of Christianity was then in the hands of hostile Muslims. This intrusion resulted in the hindering of pilgrimages and concern of the fate of the churches in the city, in particular the Church of the Holy Sepulchre. Urban II called for an armed response to free the Holy City which was answered through Europe. His impassioned speech depicted the captivity of the city where Christ had suffered and died.

Byzantine emperor Alexios I Komnenos, worried about the advances of the Seljuks into his territory, also had asked the pope for aid against the invading Turks and was expected to take a major role in the expedition. It remains unclear if Urban II had plans for how the lands conquered by his Crusaders would be governed. At a minimum, those regions that had been captured from Byzantium would reasonably be expected to be returned to the empire's control. Those areas had significant Greek-speaking populations should welcome the restoration Byzantine control and likely extended as far south as Antioch. Any further would have taxed the empire's infrastructure and resources.

The beginning of the Crusade
The spiritual leader of the Crusade was Adhemar of Le Puy, appointed by the pope as his legate. The principal military leaders were Raymond of Saint-Gilles, Godfrey of Bouillon, his brother Baldwin of Boulogne and cousin Baldwin of Bourcq, Bohemond of Taranto and his nephew Tancred, Robert Curthose, Stephen of Blois, Hugh of Vermandois, and Robert II of Flanders. In total and including non-combatants, the forces are estimated to have numbered as many as 100,000. Departing in the summer of 1096, the crusader forces gradually arrived in Anatolia. Their first encounter was at the Siege of Nicaea in June 1097 resulting in a Crusader victory. In July, the crusaders won the Battle of Dorylaeum.

Crusader distrust of Alexios began after Nicaea, as the Seljuk defenders chose to surrender to the Byzantine forces rather than the Franks. Dorylaeum was also returned to the empire as the Crusaders marched south. The now entered an area of Palestine that was traditionally not under Byzantine control. Alexios had a role as a protector of the Orthodox churches in the Holy Land, and may have expected that newly captured lands would be his vassals. Whatever arrangements between the emperor and the Crusader leaders would soon change.

The siege of Antioch
With their victories, the Crusader army then marched to Antioch, situated midway between Constantinople and Jerusalem. Described in a letter by Stephen of Blois as "a city very extensive, fortified with incredible strength and almost impregnable", the idea of taking the city by assault was a discouraging one. The army began the Siege of Antioch on 20 October 1097, called one of the "greatest sieges in history," resulted in the capture of most the city except for the citadel by 3 June 1098. John the Oxite was reinstated as Greek Orthodox Patriarch of Antioch by Adhemar who wished to keep good relations with the Byzantines, especially as Bohemond planning to claim the city for himself. However, the city was now short on food, and the army of Kerbogha was still a threat, establishing a siege of the city on 9 June.

Many of the Crusaders had deserted before Kerbogha arrived, including Stephen of Blois. Stephen had seen Kerbogha's army encamped near Antioch and assumed all hope was lost. The latest wave of deserters confirmed his fears. Stephen and the other deserters met Alexios, who was on his way to assist the Crusaders. Stephen convinced him that his colleagues were likely dead. Knowing that there was another Seljuk army nearby, he decided to return to Constantinople rather than risking battle. Bohemond's half-brother Guy of Hauteville was on the emperor's staff and begged him to march on, on the chance that the Crusading force could still be saved. But no one supported his plea. The Byzantine army retreated northward.

It would have fared better for both the empire and eastern Christendom had Alexius listened to Guy's pleas, even though he could not have reached Antioch before the battle had been fought. When the Crusaders learned that the imperial army had turned back, their bitterness was profound. They were the warriors of Christ, fighting against the infidel, and the refusal to come to their aid was regarded as an act of treason towards the Church. The Crusaders could not appreciate the emperor's other duties, and that the neglect showed at Antioch justified their suspicion and dislike already felt towards the Greeks. The empire, and particularly Alexios, were never forgiven. From this point onward, any understandings with Byzantium were evidently "null and void."

As a result, Bohemond found it in himself to profit off of the situation. After Kerbogha fled, the citadel finally surrendered, but only to Bohemond personally, rather than to Raymond of Saint-Gilles, an outcome that seemed to have been arranged beforehand without Raymond's knowledge. He then ejected the troops not under his control. In response, Raymond kept sole control of the fortified bridge and the palace of the Seljuk governor of the city. But Raymond and Adhemar both fell ill, and their followers found themselves maltreated by the Normans and others. With little resistance, Bohemond behaved as the master of the city.

The capture of Jerusalem
Bohemond's refusal to turn over Antioch contributed to problems with the empire and among Crusader leaders. In early June, they reached Ramla, whose residents had fled. There, they discovered that the port of Jaffa had been abandoned by the Fatimids. Not wishing to leave the port unprotected, the leaders decided to leave what would become the Bishopric of Lydda and Ramla under the control of Robert of Rouen, the first Roman Catholic bishop in Palestine.

When the First Crusade began, Jerusalem was held by the Seljuk Turks. Al-Afdal Shahanshah, the new Fatimid vizier recaptured the city in August 1098. Not wishing the engage the large Frankish army, he offered to negotiate a settlement over Jerusalem. The offer was rebuffed by the leaders. The Egyptians were surprised at the rejection, as they did not have time to mount an effective counteroffensive, and so preferred negotiation.

On 6 June 1099, the Crusading armies, provisioned with the supplies discovered at Ramla, set off for Jerusalem. As they reached al-Qubayba, just to the west, a delegation of Christians from Bethlehem pleaded for the Franks to free them from Islamic rule. Tancred and Baldwin of Bourcq were dispatched with a force of a hundred knights. They reached Christ's birthplace, liberating the city, celebrated by a Mass at the Church of the Nativity. Tancred returned to join the main army, but first placing his banner above the sacred church of Bethlehem.

The army reached the outer fortifications of Jerusalem on 7 June 1099 and began the Siege of Jerusalem. An initial attack on the city failed, and the siege became a stalemate, until they breached the walls on 15 July 1099. Iftikhar al-Dawla, the commander of the garrison, struck a deal with Raymond, surrendering the citadel in return for being granted safe passage to Ascalon. For two days, the Crusaders massacred the inhabitants and pillaged the city. Jerusalem had been returned to Christian rule.

The election of Godfrey
Urban II died on 29 July 1099, fourteen days after the fall of Jerusalem to the Crusaders, but the news of the liberation of the Holy City had not yet reached Italy. He was succeeded by Paschal II. The debate over the rule of Jerusalem–secular or ecclesiastical–would be made without papal leadership. The clergy's desire to elect a patriarch first was rejected, and a ruler was to be selected, a choice narrowed to Raymond of Saint-Gilles and Godfrey of Bouillon. Godfrey was chosen but would not wear a crown, reflecting the mood of the Crusaders.

The debate over leadership

On 17 July 1099, the leaders of the Crusade met to discuss the administration of Jerusalem. Urgent matters such as disposal of corpses, quarters for soldiers and pilgrims, a preparations to meet an expected Egyptian counterattack had to be dealt with. The question of the election of a king was raised, causing a protest from the clergy. They felt that spiritual needs came first and a patriarch must be first appointed who would then preside over the election of a ruler. Had Symeon II of Jerusalem remained in the city, his rights would as patriarch have been respected by both Adhemar and the Crusaders who knew of him from Antioch. But no others were acceptable and the proposal to elect the patriarch before the king was abandoned.

According to the account of Raymond of Aguilers in his Historia Francorum qui ceperunt Iherusalem, the clergy were opposed to the naming of a king in the Holy City. He also raised the specter of "the kingdom of David," a view held commonly by the Crusaders.

And so, the leaders were unable to agree upon a suitable candidate and the clergy was against the appointment of a king over the Holy City. The place that Christ suffered and had been crowned with thorns should be a spiritual realm, governed by the Church. The ecclesiastical leader should be supported by a secular ruler bearing the lesser title of "advocate" or "protector."

From the beginning, Jerusalem was variously called the kingdom of David, the kingdom of Judea, the kingdom of God and the patrimony of Christ. For example, at the Council of Clermont, Fulcher of Chartres, writing in his Gesta Francorum Iherusalem Peregrinantium, reported that Urban II said: 

Baldric of Dol wrote in his Historiæ Hierosolymitanæ that the pope cited Psalm 79:1–3 to demonstrate that the heathens (Muslims) had conquered the haeareditas (inheritance) of God. According to Baldric's account of the speech at Clermont, Urban II said: When they entered Jerusalem, the Crusaders regarded it as a regnum (kingdom). The First Crusade had been conducted in an atmosphere of religious fervor and the Crusaders entering Jerusalem are believed to have thought they were entering the realm of the Biblical Jewish kings who were succeeded by Christ. In the kingdom of David and Jesus, the messianic belief was that it was wrong to elect a king where Christ had worn a crown of thorns.

The selection of the ruler of the kingdom

The right to rule the Holy City now became the focus of this friction. Raymond of Saint-Gilles, once the Crusade's prospective leader, had lost so much support because of the debacle at Arqa and his continued support of the discredited Holy Lance that he was now eclipsed by Godfrey of Bouillon. The early chroniclers differ some on precisely what happened.

Gesta Francorum describes the selection of Godfrey as leader in the simplest of terms:

The chronicle of Raymond of Aguilers states:

Peter Tudebode was part of the Army of Raymond of Saint-Gilles and wrote an account of the Crusade called Historia de Hierosolymitano itinere. Peter was present in Jerusalem and reported the following account:

And so on 22 July 1099, Godfrey of Bouillon was elected the first Latin ruler of Jerusalem. Shortly thereafter, on 1 August 1099, Arnulf of Chocques was elected as the first Latin Patriarch of Jerusalem.

The Crown of Thorns
It is accepted by historians that after his election Godfrey refused to wear a crown, or diadem, in Jerusalem where Christ had worn the crown of thorns. Numerous original and derivative sources confirm this.

Benedictine historian Guibert of Nogent wrote in his Dei gesta per Francos  (God's deeds through the Franks):

  

Historia belli sacri (Tudebodus imitatus et continuatus) was a history written by an unknown monk at the Abbey of Monte Cassino around 1130. The Historia covers the First Crusade and the early days of the Principality of Antioch. The anonymous work states that:

Chronicler and archbishop William of Tyre wrote in his Chronique, Historia rerum in partibus transmarinis gestarum:

The Lignages d'Outremer, written in the 13th century, would also claim that Godfrey of Bouillon would not wear a crown of gold where Jesus had worn one of thorns.    

French archaeologist Melchior de Vogüé wrote in his Les églises de la Terre Sainte (1860) the following description of Godfrey's tomb:  

The fact that Godfrey would not wear a crown did not resolve the dispute of what his title (or titles) would be and what his powers as the first Latin ruler of Jerusalem would be.

The title of Godfrey
The original sources referred to Godfrey of Bouillon, elected as the first Latin ruler of the kingdom of Jerusalem, in three ways: king, prince or advocate. Later works frequently use the term baron instead of prince, and defender or protector versus advocate. In some cases, multiple designators were used.

King, or rex
Writers of chronicles who were not on the First Crusade tended to identify Godfrey as rex, or king. These chronicles or histories were written during the reign of Baldwin I of Jerusalem or later, when rulers had taken the title of king. 

Guibert of Nogent in his Dei gesta per Francos, which was begun in 1108 and finished in 1121, states: 

Baldric of Dol wrote his Historiae Hierosolymitanae libri IV in 1105 while abbot of Bourgueil, later becoming archbishop of Dol-en-Bretagne. His account of Godfrey's title includes the following:

French friar Robert the Monk wrote his chronicle of the First Crusade, Historia Hierosolymitana, between 1107–1120. It was a rewriting of the Gesta Francorum with a Benedictine interpretation. He characterized Godfrey as follows:

Historia belli sacri, orTudebodus imitatus et continuatus, was an anonymous account of the First Crusade compiled around 1130. It states:

English chronicler Orderic Vitalis wrote his Historia Ecclesiastica after 1110 and before 1141 and states:  

Historian Anna Komnene, the daughter of Alexios I, wrote in her Alexiad around 1148: 

  

English historian William of Malmesbury wrote his Gesta Regum Anglorum, published in 1127. This was translated into by English historian John Allen Giles into William of Malmesbury's Chronicle of the kings of England: from the earliest period to the reign of King Stephen. It states:

Prince, or principem
A different title is given to Godfrey of Bouillon by the anonymous author of Gesta Francorum, Peter Tudebode and Fulcher of Chartres, all of whom took part in the First Crusade, as well as Albert of Aachen who had good sources among the participants. They employed some form of princeps, sometimes in variations such as princeps regini or princeps civitati.

In the Gesta Francorum, the description of Godfrey is presented as: 

Peter Tudebode wrote in the Historia de Hierosolymitano itinere describing him as follows:

Albert of Aachen described him as follows in the Historia Hierosolymitanae:

Fulcher of Chartres wrote of him in the Gesta Francorum Iherusalem Peregrinantium: 

The Annals of St. James of Liège describe Godfrey's authority in a similar fashion to that by Fulcher of Chartres, referring to Godfrey as a principaltus: dux poster Godefridus suit principatum.

Advocate, or Advocatus Sancti Sepulchri
Most modern Crusades historians refer to Godfrey of Bouillon as Advocatus Sancti Sepulchri, meaning advocate or defender of the Holy Sepulchre. The term advocatus had been in use since the time of Charlemagne, and the Glossarium ad scriptores mediae et infimae Latinitatis (1678) by Charles du Fresne, sieur du Cange provides an early definition of advocatus as applied to French royalty. The advocati, or avoués, included the barons, who held the advocateship of the abbeys in their domain. The designators advocatus and defensor were, since Roman times, used in conjunction with the titles of imperator, rex and princeps, and so it is feasible that Godfrey of Bouillon had multiple titles.

The main source of the title of advocatus comes from a letter of Daimbert of Pisa, also known as Dagobert. Daimbert's position when he went east was as papal legate to the Crusade, appointed by Urban II  to succeed Adhemar of Le Puy, who had died on 1 August 1098. Shortly after Christmas 1099, Arnulf of Chocques, was deposed as Latin patriarch on the grounds that his election had been uncanonical. With the support of Bohemund, Daimbert was elected in his place. Public opinion had always held that the Holy Land should be the patrimony of the church, but Arnulf had been too weak to establish supremacy. Dagobert's position was stronger, as he was papal legate and had the support of the Pisan fleet

The letter in question was written in Laodicea in September or October 1099 while Daimbert was still papal legate and archbishop of Pisa. It was addressed to the successor of Urban II who had died on 29 July 1099. Paschal II was elected pope on 13 August 1099, but the letter was addressed simply to the "lord Pope of the Roman Church, to all the bishops, and all who cherish the Christian faith." Daimbert had just arrived there with the Pisan fleet when he encountered Raymond of Saint-Gilles and other princes returning west from Jerusalem. While Godfrey was still in Jerusalem, the letter was stated as from Daimbert, Godfrey and Raymond. 

The letter it titled Epistula (Dagoberti) Pisani archiepiscopi et Godefridi ducis et Raimundi de S. Aegidii et uniuerei exercitus in terra Israel ad papam et omnes Christi fideles, and is identified as the official summary of the Crusade from 19 June 1097 – 12 August 1099.

The Regesta Regni Hierosolymitani, MXCVII–MCCXCI, a collection of some 900 charters of the kingdom of Jerusalem from 1097–1291 includes the following entry:

Supporting evidence for the title of advocatus can be found in the Gesta episcoporum Virdunensium et abbatum sancti Vitoni by Laurence of Liège writing in the 1140s. He gives a detailed account of the preparations made by Godfrey and Baldwin for the First Crusade and is believed to have received reports from returning crusaders from the Contingent of Godfrey of Bouillon, many of which were from Liège. Laurence states that Godfrey was "appointed by God to rule the kingdom of the Holy City but that he was not called king but advocatus:

Albert of Aachen links advocate and king when he describes Godfrey's authority as:

Historia et Gesta Ducis Gotfridi seu historia de desidione Terræ sanctæ  (Historia Gotfridi) by two anonymous German authors (Anonymi Rhenani) covers the First Crusade and the period from 1106-1191. It is derivative of the works of Bartolf of Nangis, Robert the Monk, Jacques de Vitry and Oliver of Paderborn, and was published in 1141. In regard to Godfrey's title it states:

Nevertheless, there is no direct evidence that the title of advocate of the Holy Sepulchre was ever adopted by Godfrey himself.

Later kings as Advocate
The successors of Godfrey were also sometimes referred to as advocate or defender in addition to king. Some examples include:

 Albert of Aachen uses the phrase rege ac defensor in describing kings of Jerusalem after Baldwin I's death.
 Regesta Regni Hierosolymitani shows the following entry dated 1104: Balduinus rex Iudee et Iherusalem ac defensor sanctissimi Sepulchri domini nostri Ihesu Christi (Baldwin, king of Judea and Jerusalem and defender of the Holy Sepulcher of our Lord Jesus Christ)
 Walter the Chancellor wrote Bella Antiochena (Wars of Antioch) and described Baldwin II of Jerusalem as: Rex qui solus post Dominum dominus et defensor Christanitatis (the king who alone after the Lord is lord and defender of Christianity)
 Anselm of Canterbury in his S. Anselmi Cantuariensis Archiepiscopi Opera Omnia wrote to Baldwin II that he should behave towards the church as an advocatus et defensor.
Writing later, William of Tyre referred to Amalric I of Jerusalem, king from 1173–1174, as follows: rex Ierosolimorum, loco rum penerabilium dominice passionis et resurrectionis defensor et advocatus.

Treatment in later histories

The title of Godfrey of Bouillon has been treated in different ways by both the later historians of the Crusades as well as the modern historians. The first among these is English churchman and historian Thomas Fuller in his The Historie of the Holy Warre (1639). 

French Jesuit and historian Louis Maimbourg wrote one of the earliest comprehensive histories of the Crusades in Histoire des Croisades pour la délivrance de la Terre Sainte (1675), This was translated by English historian John Nalson called The History of the Crusade, or the Expeditions of the Christian Princes, for the Conquest of the Holy Land (1684). Nalson's translation of Maimbourg's account states:

English historian Edward Gibbon wrote his monumental History of the Decline and Fall of the Roman Empire (1776–1789) which were later excerpted into The Crusades, A.D. 1095–1261 (1869). He had this to say about the election of Godfrey of Bouillon to the leadership of Jerusalem:

French Crusades historian Joseph François Michaud wrote his Histoire des Croisades in 3 volumes (1812–1822), which was translated by William Robson as History of the Crusades (1875). Concerning the election of Godfrey of Bouillon, Michaud wrote (in translation):

English historian Charles Mills wrote the seminal work History of the Crusades for the Recovery and Possession of the Holy Land (1820) which was critical of earlier histories, particularly that of Gibbon. Mills relates the story of Godfrey of Bouillon as follows. 

Belgian archaeologist Alexis Guillaume Charles Prosper Hody wrote a number of books on the history and tomb of Godfrey of Bouillon, including Godefroid de Bouillon et les rois latins de Jérusalem: étude historique sur leurs tombeaux jadis existant dans l'église de la Rescurrection (1859).

     
German historian Bernhard von Kugler wrote in his Geschichte der Kreuzzüge (1880):

English soldier, explorer and antiquarian C. R. Conder is mostly known for his archaeological works of the Holy Land. He also wrote a history called The Latin Kingdom of Jerusalem (1897) the described the events surrounding the election of Godfrey of Bouillon as:

The German historian Reinhold Röhricht laid much of the foundation of modern Crusade research. His seminal work on the Crusades was Geschichte der Kreuzzüge im Umriss (1898) where he wrote of Godfrey of Bouillon:

Heinrich Hagenmeyer was a German historian who specialized in original sources and texts from the beginning of the Crusades. His Chronologie de la première croisade 1094–1100 (1902) provides the most detailed chronology of the First Crusade and immediate aftermath, indexed to source information. He writes:

American historian Dana Carleton Munro wrote in his A History of the Middle Ages (1902):

Belgian historian Charles Moeller wrote in his Godefroid de Bouillon et Godefroid de Bouillon et l'Avouerie du Saint-Sépulcre (1908):

Louis R. Bréhier writing in the article Crusades published in the Catholic Encyclopedia (1908):

 

Ernest Barker writing in the article Crusades published in the 11th edition of the Encyclopædia Britannica (1911):

 

Anglo-Irish historian J. B. Bury was editor-in-chief of The Cambridge Medieval History (1911–1936). Volume 5: Contest of Empire and Papacy (1926) includes a chapter entitled The First Crusade. The discussion on Godfrey of Bouillon includes the following:

French medievalist and Byzantinist Ferdinand Chalandon wrote his Histoire de la Première Croisade jusqu'à l'élection de Godefroi de Bouillon (1925) where he described the election of Godfrey of Bouillon citing Gesta Francorum and Raymond of Aguilers as sources:

American historian John L. La Monte wrote Feudal Monarchy in the Latin Kingdom of Jerusalem, 1100–1291 (1932). There it is described:

 

American historian John Andressohn wrote the biography The Ancestry and Life of Godfrey of Bouillon (1947) and described the election and title of Godfrey of Bouillon as follows:, pgs. 105–106, Chapter VI: Godfrey as Head of Jerusalem 

 

British historian Stephen Runciman wrote his A History of the Crusades in three volumes (1951–1954). In the first, Volume One: The First Crusade and the Foundation of the Kingdom of Jerusalem (1951), he writes:

American historian Kenneth M. Setton was the general editor of the comprehensive Wisconsin Collaborative History of the Crusades published in six volumes (1969–1989). The first volume was The First One Hundred Years (1969) and included Chapter X. The First Crusade: Antioch to Ascalon, written by Runciman. In it is described: 

British historian John France wrote the following in his Victory in the East: A military history of the First Crusade (1994). France is also the author of an in-depth study on the election and title of Godfrey of Bouillon.

 

British historian Jonathan Riley-Smith wrote numerous works on the Crusades and, in particular, a study of the title of Godfrey of Bouillon. Based on that study, he generally referred to Godfrey as simply the ruler of Jerusalem. For example, as editor-in-chief of The Oxford Illustrated History of the Crusades (2001), he compiled a chronology that included:

British historian Thomas Asbridge has written a number of works on the Crusades including The First Crusade: A New History (2004) in which he discusses the election of Godfrey of Bouillon as follows:

In Asbridge's later work, The Crusades: The War for the Holy Land (2012), he writes: 

British historian Christopher Tyerman has written extensively on the Crusades, including God's War: A New History of the Crusades (2006) in which he describes the election of Godfrey in the following terms:

The Crusades—An Encyclopedia (2006) was edited by British historian Alan V. Murray who also authored studies on the title of Godfrey of Bouillon. In the former, the article on Godfrey of Bouillon states: 

The Routledge Companion to the Crusades was written by British historian Peter Lock and states: 

With the exception of Jonathan Riley-Smith, modern historians refer to Godfrey of Bouillon as advocate of defender of the Holy Sepulchre.

References

Bibliography

Versions of the original sources referenced frequently herein all appear in the Recueil des historiens des croisades (RHC). Editions that are used are consistent with those in Murray's The Crusader Kingdom of Jerusalem: A Dynastic History 1099-1125. Some relevant passages are also quoted in Krey's The First Crusade: The Accounts of Eyewitnesses and Participants.
 
 
 
 
 
 
 
 
 
 
 
 
 
 
 
 
 
 
 
 
 
 
 
 
 
 
 
 
 
 
 
 
 
 
 
 
 
 
 
 
 
 
 
 
 
 
 
 
 
 
 
 
 
 
  
 
 
 
 
 
 
 

11th-century kings of Jerusalem
Kings of Jerusalem